Lidia Alexandrovna Malyavko or Lidziya Aliaxandravna Maliavka (born 23 January 1995) is a Belarusian-Russian ice hockey player, currently playing in the Zhenskaya Hockey League (ZhHL) with Tornado Dmitrov. She represented  at the 2017 IIHF Women's World Championship and won a silver medal with the national team in the women's ice hockey tournament at the 2017 Winter Universiade.

Malyavko has previously played with HK Pantera Minsk in the Elite Women's Hockey League (EWHL) and Latvian Championship in women's ice hockey, and in the ZhHL with SKSO Yekaterinburg, SKIF Nizhny Novgorod, Biryusa Krasnoyarsk, and Kometa Odintsovo.

References

External links
 

1995 births
Living people
Belarusian ice hockey forwards
Belarusian women's ice hockey players
Biryusa Krasnoyarsk players
Competitors at the 2017 Winter Universiade
European Women's Hockey League players
People from Hrodna District
Russian people of Belarusian descent
Russian women's ice hockey forwards
HC SKIF players
HC Tornado players
Universiade gold medalists for Russia
Universiade medalists in ice hockey